Shahabaz Aman (born 27 December 1969) is an Indian playback singer and composer. He was born in Malappuram, Kerala, India. He is also a stage performer of Ghazal music. Shahabaz is known for his soulful, romantic voice and unique style of singing. He has released music albums of various genres and performed across India and Persian Gulf countries. He is a two time winner of Kerala State Film Award for Best Singer.

Early life

Career

Studio albums

Soundtrack albums

Singles

As playback singer

Miscellaneous

As lyricist

Remix albums

Awards

See also 
 Kerala State Film Award for Best Singer

References

Living people
1969 births

Malayalam playback singers

Indian film score composers
Indian male ghazal singers
Indian male playback singers
20th-century Indian male singers
20th-century Indian singers
Singers from Kerala
People from Malappuram
Indian male film score composers
Kerala State Film Award winners